Framlingham Town Football Club is a football club based in Framlingham, Suffolk, England.

History
The club was established in 1887 and started playing in the Ipswich & District League. They dropped into the Framlingham League, before playing in the Leiston League and the Woodbridge League and returning to the Ipswich & District League.

Framlingham won Division Two of the (renamed) Suffolk & Ipswich League in 1980–81, and the League Cup in 1989–90. In 1991–92 they won the Senior Division and the League Cup. Although they applied to join Division One of the Eastern Counties League, they were rejected because they did not have a stand or floodlights. In 1995–96 they reached the final of the Suffolk Senior Cup, losing 3–0 to Grundisburgh. In 2010–11 they entered the FA Vase for the first time.

At the end of the 2011–12 season Framlingham were relegated from the Senior Division to Division One. In 2014–15 the club finished second in Division One, earning promotion back to the Senior Division. After finishing fifth in the Senior Division in 2015–16, the club were promoted to Division One of the Eastern Counties League. They were Division One runners-up in 2017–18, securing promotion to the Premier Division. However, they finished bottom of the Premier Division the following season and were relegated to Division One North.

Ground
The club initially played at Dickson's Meadow, before moving to Brunnings Meadow, both of which are now part of Framlingham College. They later moved to the Red House Farm and then Hayning's Meadow in 1932; Hayning's Meadow was subsequently renamed Pageant Field after a pageant took place at the site in 1935. In 1951 a group of demobilised soldiers from World War II bought sixteen acres of land on Badingham Road to establish a new sports club; the club later moved to the site, and then bought it in 1983. A clubhouse was built on one side of the pitch, incorporating a seated stand named after John Durrant, with a small covered stand erected on the other side of the pitch. Floodlights were installed in the early 2000s after being bought from the Sizewell B nuclear power station.

Honours
Suffolk & Ipswich League
Senior Division champions 1991–92
Division Two champions 1980–81
League Cup winners 1989–90, 1991–92

Records
Best FA Cup performance: Preliminary round, 2017–18, 2019–20
Best FA Vase performance: First round, 2010–11

References

External links
Official website

Football clubs in England
Football clubs in Suffolk
Association football clubs established in 1887
1887 establishments in England
Suffolk and Ipswich Football League
Eastern Counties Football League
Framlingham